Loch Freuchie, also known as Fraoch, the heatherly loch, is a large freshwater loch on a north-west to south-east orientation, within Glen Quaich in Perth and Kinross.

History
Robert Burns passed beside the loch during his tour of the Highlands in the summer of 1787.

Geography
Loch Freuchie is a loch in a pastoral setting surrounded by green fields and patches of woodlands. The loch contains the remains of a crannog that is located on the southwest shore of the loch. The island has been planted with conifers. River Quaich, sometimes known as River Freuchie to anglers flows into the loch and out before becoming River Braan that flow into the Tay. On the eastern shoreline is the remain of a township. 

Loch Freuchie is a trout-fishing loch.

Gallery

See also
 List of lochs in Scotland

References

External links
 Loch Freuchie and its "Crannog"

Freshwater lochs of Scotland
Lochs of Perth and Kinross
Tay catchment
Protected areas of Perth and Kinross
Conservation in the United Kingdom
Birdwatching sites in Scotland